A Turtle's Tale 2: Sammy's Escape from Paradise (titled Sammy's Great Escape in the UK, Sammy 2 everywhere else; , literally "Sammy's adventures 2") is a 2012 English-language Belgian-French animated film sequel to the 2010 animated film A Turtle's Tale: Sammy's Adventures. The sequel features the voice talents of Kaitlyn Maher, Khary Payton and Carlos Alazraqui.

Plot
Sammy and Ray are supervising their new grandchildren, when seagulls attack them and both Sammy and Ray and two of their grandchildren Ella and Ricky are captured on trawler. While Ella and Ricky are separated and sent to the seabed, Sammy and Ray are taken to an aquarium with Lulu, a crazy lobster and Jimbo a bug-eyed blobfish. Escape plans are run and tried by the leading seahorse Big D. Ella and Ricky set out with Annabel and Margaret, the pink octopus mother and daughter in order to rescue their grandfathers, getting chased by a pair of barracudas when they get there. After much communication trouble, Ella and Ricky interpret from Sammy that in order to escape the aquarium several squids expel ink into the ventilation system, while all the aquarium inhabitants play dead. Before initiating the escape plan, Sammy and Ray get the tyrannical Big D out of the way. The reluctant aquarium manager opens the emergency doors allowing all sea creatures out to freedom.

Cast
 Kaitlyn Maher as Ella, a baby Green sea turtle who is Shelly and Sammy's granddaughter.
 Carter Hastings as Ricky, a baby Leatherback sea turtle who is Rita and Ray's grandson.
 Alan Shearman as Sammy,  an elderly Green sea turtle who is Shelly's husband and Ella's grandfather.
 Khary Payton (Thomas Lee) as Ray, an elderly Leatherback sea turtle who is Rita's husband and Ricky's grandfather.
 Dino Andrade as Spanish-accented hogfish, the Consuelo's husband.
 Alanna Ubach as a hogfish, who is Manuel's wife and Rosie a female elderly Magellanic penguin.
 Carlos Alazraqui as Big D, a villainous Barbour's seahorse who acts as a leader to the tank's inhabitants and Maurice, a male elderly Magellanic penguin.
 Camille Labadie as Annabel, a pink baby octopus.
 Bridget Hoffman as Margaret,  Annabel's mother.
 Joe J. Thomas as Lulu Lulu, a lobster with dissociative identity disorder.
 Bill Parks as Jimbo, a blobfish.
 Jaylen Ahmadyar as Manager.

Additional voices
 Cinda Adams as Veterinarian
 Robin Atkin Downes as Diver
 Roxanne Reese as Rita an Leatherback sea turtle who is Ray's wife and Ricky's grandmother
 Grey DeLisle as Shelly, a Green sea turtle who is Sammy's wife and Ella's grandmother
 Cam Clarke as Seagull 1
 Kyle Hebert as Seagull 2
 Douglas Ryan Roth as Seagull 3
 Lex Lang as Big Frenchman
 Michael McConnohie as Security Guard
 Mari Devon as Female Patron 1 (American Woman)
 Keegan Cameron Thomas as Female Patron 1's Son (American Boy)
 Elisa Gabrielli as Female Patron 2
 John Kassir as Marco, a French-accented Green moray who is Big D's henchmen as well as Seagull 4
 Joey D'Auria  as  Phillippe and French-accented Green moray who is one of the Big D's henchmen
 Darren Capozzi as Tremaine
 Eric Bauza and Jimmy Zoppi as a pair of unnamed Rayfish brothers who attempted to escape from the tank by hadding inside of a dolphin's mouth, but they ended up eaten by barracudas.
 Patrick Seitz as Toots an joking clownfish
 Sam Riegel as Jax an stonefish who feels stressed about human tourists staring at him
 Lara Cody  as an unnamed yellow tang who is Big D's girlfriend
 Doug Stone as Albert an Hammerhead shark
 Chris Ciulla & Jon Ferrante as Russian Snowcrabs
 Terri Douglas as Little Fish (Cuttlefish)
 Willie James Warren Jr. and Mario Anthony as Jamaican Fishermen
 Domonic Paris as Large Fisherman
 Michael Sun Lee as Japanese Fisherman

Soundtrack
The soundtrack for the film includes various songs by various artists, including the musical score for the film from Ramin Djawadi. American country singer Darius Rucker contributed the song "True Believers", which is included in the original soundtrack and the North American direct-to-video release of the film. Greyson Chance's song "Stranded" is instead heard in the releases of the film outside of the US and Canada.

The song Hello was sung by Martin Solveig and Dragonette.

Reception 
On the review aggregator website Rotten Tomatoes, 20% of ten critics' reviews are positive, with an average rating of 4/10.

Sequel
The film was followed by a second sequel titled Sammy & Co: Turtle Paradise released in 2017.

References

External links

 
 

2012 films
2012 computer-animated films
2010s French animated films
Animated films about turtles
Belgian animated films
Films scored by Ramin Djawadi
Films directed by Ben Stassen
French sequel films
StudioCanal films
StudioCanal animated films
2010s English-language films
2010s American films
2010s British films
2010s French films